These are the list of ecotourist sites in Ghana. Some are well developed, while others are not.

Ashanti region
Adanwomase Kente weaving
Ahwiaa wood carvings
Bobiri Butterfly sanctuary 
Ntonso Adinkra Arts and crafts village
Bonwire Kente Weaving
Lake Bosumtwi
Kumasi Zoo
Pankrono pottery
Kejetia Market

Brong Ahafo region
Mim bour
Mim Lake
Kintampo Waterfalls
Asumura
Boabeng-Fiema Monkey Sanctuary
Buoyem
Tanoboase Sacred Grove and Shrine

Central Region

 Kakum National Park

Eastern region
Adjeikrom
Afram Plains
Akim Abompe
Tini Waterfall
Boti Waterfall
Bunso Aboretum
Kutunse earth satellite

Greater Accra region
 Shai Hills
Labadi Beach

Northern region

Daboya
Mole National Park
Larabanga Mosque

Upper East region
Paga
Sirigu

Upper West region
Gwollu
Wechiau

Volta region
Amedzofe
Kpetoe
Liati Wote
Kyabobo National Park
Tiafi Atome
Wli Waterfalls
Avu-Lagoon
Volta Lake

Western region

Ankasa National Park
Nzulezu A village on stilts
Wassa Domama[Rock Shrine]

See also

References

External links
 www.graphic.com.gh
 http://www.ghanacamping.com/index.php?id=15&L=
 https://web.archive.org/web/20130926010202/http://www.ghana.travel/ghana_tourist_board/

Ghana
Lists of tourist attractions in Ghana
Ecological tourist sites